The Site of the John and Mary Jones House is a site in Chicago, Illinois in the United States, that was designated as a Chicago Landmark on May 26, 2004. John Jones and his wife Mary Jones were central figures of the abolitionist movement in Chicago, led early struggles to achieve civil rights for Blacks and were involved in local and state politics (including John Jones having been the first African-American to hold elected office in Illinois as a member of the Cook County Board of Commissioners.)

They lived at 218 Edina Place (later Plymouth Court, and now corresponding approximately
to 946 South Plymouth Court I 947 South Park Terrace) from 1857 to
1872. 

The home served as a "station" on the Underground Railroad, which helped hundreds of fugitive slaves find freedom in the North and Canada. Serving as "conductors" on the Underground Railroad, the Joneses provided food and shelter to fugitive slaves, as well as clothing, money for transportation, and often bail and bond. According to Jones' daughter Lavinia, John and Mary Jones were responsible for sending hundreds of fugitives to Canada throughout the 1850s and early 1860s. 

Although the Joneses had obtained their own freedom papers, they put themselves at great risk through their involvement with the Underground Railroad. Under the Fugitive Slave Act of 1793, harboring or preventing the arrest of a fugitive slave was punishable by a $500 fine and possible enslavement for free blacks. Further, the Fugitive Slave Act of 1850 led to manhunts by mercenary slave catchers, many of whom were not beyond capturing and putting into slavery free blacks that had never been slaves. 

Their Chicago residence also served as a meeting place for locally and nationally prominent abolitionists, including Allan Pinkerton, Frederick Douglass and John Brown, and was the center of their life-long efforts to achieve greater civil rights for enslaved and free blacks alike.

It is not known exactly when the house was demolished, but by 1883 its location had
become part of the Dearborn Street Station railroad yards, constructed that year. More recently, in the late-1970s, the grounds of the house were incorporated into the then-newly developed Dearborn Park neighborhood of Chicago's near south side. Today, at the corner of 9th Street and Plymouth Court, there is no plaque or any other form of marker to commemorate the historic Jones house.

References

See also
 List of Chicago Landmarks

Houses in Chicago
Chicago Landmarks
Demolished buildings and structures in Chicago
Underground Railroad in Illinois
Houses on the Underground Railroad